The Texas House of Representatives 136th District represents portions of Austin, Cedar Park, and Round Rock in Williamson County. The current Representative is John Bucy III, who has represented the district since 2019.

A small stretch of major highway I-35 runs through the district.

References 

136